Kolychevo is a rural locality (a village) in Moshokskoye Rural Settlement, Sudogodsky District, Vladimir Oblast, Russia. The population was 102 as of 2010. There are 2 streets.

Geography 
Kolychevo is located 39 km southeast of Sudogda (the district's administrative centre) by road. Karevo is the nearest rural locality.

References 

Rural localities in Sudogodsky District